Buratsky is a rural locality (a khutor) in Tishanskoye Rural Settlement, Nekhayevsky District, Volgograd Oblast, Russia. The population was 4 as of 2010. There is 1 street.

Geography 
Buratsky is located on the Khopyor River, 18 km east of Nekhayevskaya (the district's administrative centre) by road. Luchnovsky is the nearest rural locality.

References 

Rural localities in Nekhayevsky District